Portuondo is a surname of Spanish origin. Notable people with the surname include:

Bartolo Portuondo (1893–1981), Cuban baseball player
Emilio Núñez Portuondo (1898–1978), Cuban politician, lawyer and diplomat
Omara Portuondo (born 1930), Cuban singer and dancer
Yasser Portuondo (born 1983), Cuban volleyball player